Mãe d'Água is a municipality in the state of Paraíba in the Northeast Region of Brazil.

The municipality contains a small part of the  Pico do Jabre State Park, created in 1992.

See also
List of municipalities in Paraíba

References

Municipalities in Paraíba